is a Japanese animation studio founded on May 29, 2018 in Suginami-ku.

Establishment
The Suginami-based animation studio was independently founded after current CEO Junji Murata left Ashi Productions in 2018.

The studio's name "Maho" literally stands for "Magic". It symbolizes the studio wishing to create magical content that gives dreams.

Works

Television series

References

External links

  
 

 
Animation studios in Tokyo
Japanese animation studios
Japanese companies established in 2018
Mass media companies established in 2018
Suginami